The International Health Terminology Standards Development Organisation (IHTSDO), trading as SNOMED International, is an international non-profit organization that owns SNOMED CT, a leading clinical terminology used in electronic health records.  IHTSDO was founded in 2007 by 9 charter member countries (Australia, Canada, Denmark, Lithuania, Sweden, the Netherlands, New Zealand, the United Kingdom and the United States) in order to acquire the rights of SNOMED CT from the College of American Pathologists (CAP) and make the development of a global clinical language for healthcare an international, collaborative effort.

Governance
IHTSDO governance is defined in the IHTSDO Articles of Association. The organization is headquartered in the United Kingdom (London).

Since 2007 the number of member countries has increased from 9 to 29. The members were (as of December 2016): Australia, Belgium, Brunei, Canada, Chile, Czech Republic, Denmark, Estonia, Hong Kong, Iceland, India, Ireland, Israel, Lithuania, Malaysia, Malta, Netherlands, New Zealand, Poland, Portugal, Singapore, Slovakia, Slovenia, Spain, Sweden, Switzerland, the United Kingdom, the United States and Uruguay. The member countries provide the bulk of the institutional financing through payment of yearly member fees, which are based on gross national income. Members of IHTSDO can be either an agency of a national government or another body (such as a corporation or regional government agency) which has been endorsed by an appropriate national government authority within the country it represents. Member countries commit themselves to the dissemination of the IHTSDO terminologies within their jurisdiction, including where appropriate the creation of local translations, extensions, and mappings.
 
The general assembly (GA) is the organization's highest authority and is composed of representatives from all member countries with equal representation (although some member countries have not selected GA representatives and therefore are not represented in the GA). The GA is collectively charged with assuring that the purpose, objects and principles of the association are pursued and that the interests of IHTSDO are safeguarded. The GA appoints the management board (MB), which has overall responsibility for the management and direction of IHTSDO and has a duty to act in the best interests of the organization. The member countries are also represented by the member forum, which provides input on member priorities and helps develop the IHTSDO plan of work.

The organization is structured into four major areas: customer relations, operations, products & services, and strategy.

Seven advisory groups provide advice to the management team. In addition there are topic-specific project groups (PGs) and special interest groups (SIGs) which supplement and report to the standing committees. These groups are open and are not elected. IHTSDO PGs and SIGs include:

IHTSDO's work is documented on its website. The internal communication is supported by a Collaborative content management system.

Strategic Directions

The broad vision for IHTSDO is set out in their Articles of Association. In 2015, the General Assembly and the management board agreed that the organization's focus for the subsequent 5 years would be (1) demonstrate successful large scale implementations of SNOMED CT (2) remove barriers to adoption for customers and stakeholders, (3) enable continuous development of our product to meet customer requirements, (4) provide scalable products and services that drive SNOMED CT adoption, and (5) set new trends and shape new technologies that increase the overall use of SNOMED CT.
 
IHTSDO aims to achieve interoperability and harmonization between its terminology products and those standards produced by other international standards development organisations (SDOs). In support of this IHTSDO has negotiated a number of collaboration agreements with other SDOs, such as the World Health Organization, HL7, International Council of Nurses, IEEE, Regenstrief Institute & NPU, openEHR, and WONCA.

Meetings

IHTSDO organizes periodic conferences. Generally within these conferences time is allocated to meetings of advisory groups, project groups and SIGs, to enable them to meet face to face.  In addition there are meetings of the Member Forum and the Affiliate Forum. Advisory Groups, PGs and SIGs also communicate throughout the year via conference calls and manage messages and documents in a content management system (CMS).

Documentation

To support the implementation of SNOMED CT, a number of publications are produced by IHTSDO. These range from user guides to technical implementation guides as well as some educational materials and videos. Documents are available through the public website, but some items such as the videos can be found via YouTube. Member countries also contribute to the public domain and documents, which can often be found on individual member country websites; a link to these is provided on the IHTSDO webpages.

Office

The IHTSDO head office is located at 1 Kingdom Street, London, UK W6 6BD.

References

External links
 

Standards organisations in the United Kingdom
Medical and health organisations based in London
International medical and health organizations
Medical terminology
Organizations established in 2007